This is a list of singles that have peaked in the Top 10 of the Billboard Hot 100 during 1979.

Donna Summer scored five top ten hits during the year with "Heaven Knows", "Hot Stuff", "Bad Girls", "Dim All the Lights", and "No More Tears (Enough Is Enough)", the most among all other artists.

Top-ten singles

1978 peaks

1980 peaks

See also
 1979 in music
 List of Hot 100 number-one singles of 1979 (U.S.)
 Billboard Year-End Hot 100 singles of 1979

References

General sources

Joel Whitburn Presents the Billboard Hot 100 Charts: The Seventies
Joel Whitburn Presents the Billboard Hot 100 Charts: The Eighties
Additional information obtained can be verified within Billboard's online archive services and print editions of the magazine.

1979
United States Hot 100 Top 10